Bardo National Museum or Musée National du Bardo may refer to:

 Bardo National Museum (Algiers) in Algeria
 Bardo National Museum (Tunis) in Tunisia